The men's doubles tournament at the 1982 US Open was held from August 31 to September 12, 1982, on the outdoor hard courts at the USTA National Tennis Center in New York City, United States. Kevin Curren and Steve Denton won the title, defeating Victor Amaya and Hank Pfister in the final.

Seeds

Draw

Finals

Top half

Section 1

Section 2

Bottom half

Section 3

Section 4

External links
 Main draw
1982 US Open – Men's draws and results at the International Tennis Federation

Men's Doubles
US Open (tennis) by year – Men's doubles